Spilosoma crossi is a moth in the  family Erebidae. It was described by Rothschild in 1910. It is found in Nigeria and Gambia.

Description
Diacrisia crossi, Eoths. Nov. Zool. xvii. p. 141 (1910).

(Male) Head and thorax ochreous tinged with brown; antennae black-brown; palpi, pectus, and legs dark reddish brown, some yellow hair below shoulders, the femora yellow above; abdomen orange-yellow with brownish dorsal streak except on terminal segments, the ventral surface red-brown. Fore wing ochreous tinged with red-brown. Hind wing pale ochreous yellow, the underside tinged with red-brown except on inner area.

Hab. Gambia, Bathurst; S. Nigeria, Assaba (Crosse), type male  in Coll. Rothschild. Exp. 32 millim.

References

Spilosoma crossi at BHL

Moths described in 1910
crossi